Jaime Allende Maíz (27 July 1924 – 19 October 2003) was a Spanish field hockey player who competed in the 1948 Summer Olympics. He was a member of the Spanish field hockey team, which was eliminated in the group stage. He played all three matches as forward in the 1948 tournament.

Notes

References

External links
 
  
 
 

1924 births
2003 deaths
Spanish male field hockey players
Olympic field hockey players of Spain
Field hockey players at the 1948 Summer Olympics